Amber Jae Halliday (born 13 November 1979) is a former rower and cyclist from Adelaide, South Australia. She is an Australian national champion, a dual Olympian and a three-time world-champion in lightweight rowing. She rowed for South Australia on nine occasions for six victories in Interstate Regattas and won numerous Australian titles at the Australian National Championships.

Rowing career
A lightweight sculler, Halliday commenced her rowing at Pembroke School in Adelaide. Her senior club rowing was from the Adelaide University Boat Club.

Halliday raced in South Australian representative women's crews who contested the Victoria Cup at the Interstate Regatta. In 1998 that race was in lightweight coxless four and Halliday stroke the IV. From 1999 the lightweight women's interstate race was contested in quad sculls. Halliday raced for South Australia in quads successively from 1999 to 2004 and in 2006, 2007 & 2008. Those South Australian crews were victorious in 2000, 2002, 2003, 2004, 2007, 2008  and she was in the stroke seat for their convincing victories (margins in excess of 7 seconds) of 2003, 2004, 2007

International representative rowing career

World Championships
Halliday made her international representative debut for Australia in 1999, winning the u/23 World Championship in Hamburg in the lightweight double scull with Hannah Every.

Halliday made her first Australian senior representative appearance at the 2000 World Rowing Cup III in Lucerne, Switzerland. The next month that same crew contested the lightweight quad scull at the 2000 World Rowing Championships in Zagreb, and Halliday won a silver medal crewed with Sally Causby, Eliza Blair and Catriona Roach The following year at Lucerne 2001 that crew with Blair changed out for Josephine Lips won the gold medal, the lightweight quad scull world championship title and set  two world records in the process.

In 2002 Halliday was teamed with Causby in a double scull, and won her second World Championship title at Seville 2002. They stayed together for Milan 2003 and won the silver medal in the double scull.

At the 2006 World Rowing Championships in Eton, Dorney in the lightweight double-scull with Marguerite Houston, Halliday won the silver medal. The following year at Munich 2007 and still together in the double, Halliday and Houston won the gold and Amber's third world championship.

Olympics
Halliday was selected for and competed at the 2004 Olympic Games with double sculls partner Sally Newmarch. They set a world-best time in their heat but placed fourth in the final.

She was named South Australia's Sports Star of 2007 and then pre-selected with Marguerite Houston for the 2008 Beijing Olympics in a double-scull. They placed eighth in a 'disappointing' performance.

Cycling
In late 2008 Halliday swapped her sculling shell for a bicycle, training with the South Australian Sports Institute squad. While riding for MB Cycles, Halliday won her first ever cycle tour, the NZCT Women's Tour of New Zealand in February 2009. She was named as the 2009 Amy Gillett Foundation Scholarship winner.

On 17 January 2011 Amber was hospitalised after a racing accident sustained at Victoria Park Racecourse, Adelaide. In September 2011 her recovery was documented by the Australian Broadcasting Corporation (ABC) program, Contact Sport.

Cycling palmares

2009
 4th National Time Trial Championships, AUS
 1st Sprint Classification, National Road Race, AUS
 1st Overall Women's Tour of New Zealand, NZL
 6th Chongming Island Time Trial (1.1 UCI), CHN
 2nd Women's Time Trial Honda Hybrid Tour (formerly Herald Sun Women's Tour), AUS
 2nd Overall Honda Hybrid Tour (formerly Herald Sun Women's Tour), AUS
 25th Giro Donne, ITA
 1st Woman Annual Hell of the Marianas Century Cycle, FSM
2010
 1st  National Time Trial Champion Title
 9th National Road Race

See also
 Rowing at the 2004 Summer Olympics – Women's lightweight double sculls

References

External links

 
 
 
 

1979 births
Living people
Australian female rowers
Olympic rowers of Australia
Rowers at the 2004 Summer Olympics
Rowers at the 2008 Summer Olympics
People educated at Pembroke School, Adelaide
Cyclists from Adelaide
Rowers from Adelaide
University of Adelaide alumni
World Rowing Championships medalists for Australia
Australian female cyclists